The Federal University, Wukari was established in 2011 by the federal government of Nigeria led by the then President, Goodluck Jonathan, the school was established as one of the nine schools established at the time. Federal University, Wukari is located in the town called Wukari in Taraba State, Nigeria.

Faculties 
Federal University, Wukari has three faculties comprising 25 departments:

 Faculty of Agriculture and Life Sciences
 Faculty of Humanities, Management, and Social Sciences
 Faculty of Pure and Applied Sciences

Vice Chancellors 
The Federal University, Wukari has since its inception had vice-chancellors who have been the administrative head of the institution. In March 2016, Professor Abubakar Kundiri was appointed as the 2nd vice-chancellor of the institution, during his tenure as vice-chancellor, most of the courses offered in the school became accredited.
Professor Abubakar Musa Kundiri was on seat as the vice chancellor for five years (2016 - 2021), until January, 2021 when Professor Jude Rabo, a veterinary professor, after undergoing series of screenings was announced as the winner and appointed as the new vice-chancellor of the institution to succeed Professor Abubakar Musa Kundiri.

Ranking 
Federal University, Wukari has been ranked the 87th best University in Nigeria by webometrics as of January 2020.

See also
List of universities in Nigeria

References

Federal universities of Nigeria
Taraba State
Educational institutions established in 2011
2011 establishments in Nigeria